Tabou Airport  is an airport serving Tabou, Côte d'Ivoire.

See also
Transport in Côte d'Ivoire

References

 OurAirports - Tabou
 Great Circle Mapper - Tabou
 Google Earth

Airports in Ivory Coast
Buildings and structures in Bas-Sassandra District
San-Pédro Region